Sir Thomas Buchan-Hepburn, 3rd Baronet (30 September 1804 – 17 December 1893)  was a Scottish baronet and Conservative Party politician.

At the 1837 general election he unsuccessfully contested the Haddington Burghs.

The following year a vacancy arose in the county seat of Haddingtonshire, where he was elected unopposed. He was re-elected without a contest in 1841, and stepped down at the 1847 general election.

References

External links 
 

1804 births
1893 deaths
Baronets in the Baronetage of the United Kingdom
Scottish Tory MPs (pre-1912)
Members of the Parliament of the United Kingdom for Scottish constituencies
UK MPs 1837–1841
UK MPs 1841–1847